Fire On the Bright Sky is the first album by The Low Lows. It was released on September 12, 2006 via the label, Warm.

Track listing

 "Dear Flies, Love Spider" - 5:26
 "White Liner" - 5:29
 "Velvet" - The Low Lows, Rickard, Daniel - 4:36
 "St. Neil" - 4:10
 "Wolves Eat Dogs" - 5:47
 "Lane Fire" - 3:45
 "Poor Georgia" - 5:29
 "(No Such Thing As) Sara Jane" - 5:19
 "Aquanaut" - The Low Lows, Wolfe, Lily - 4:05
 "The Russian Ending" - 4:27

References

External links 
 [ Allmusic]

2006 albums
The Low Lows (band) albums